Project Sunrise may refer to:

AstroFlight Sunrise, an early solar powered aircraft project
Kangaroo Route#Non-stop flights,  a project by Australian airline Qantas, to fly non-stop from the East Coast of Australia to London, Paris and New York City by 2022